Michelmersh is a small, scattered village in Hampshire, England some three miles north of Romsey.

It forms a civil parish with Timsbury that forms part of the Test Valley district.
The Monarch's Way long-distance footpath crosses the parish, passing through the churchyard of the 12th century St Mary's Church. The Georgian former rectory, Michelmersh Court, is Grade II* listed  and was for many years the home of Sir David and Lady Carina Frost.

The parish is located to the east of the River Test on the northern edge of the Hampshire Basin, with chalk in the north. To the south and east of the village this is overlain by Palaeocene sands and clays of the Lambeth Group. At the southern are younger deposits of Eocene age, sloping from a ridge of the Nursling sands into a valley of London Clay. It has a brick and tile works, and extensive former sand pits on Casbrook Common, now used as a landfill site.

The name Michelmersh is derived from the Old English micel + mersc, meaning ' large marsh'.

Church

Parts of the church date to the 12th century with extensions added in the 13th century. It was twice restored in the 19th century once 1846-7 and the second time 1888-9.

The font dates from around the 14th century although it appears to have been modified at some point after 1822.

In popular culture
Michelmersh is known for being one of the main locations for the filming of the 1980s British TV series Worzel Gummidge. Other locations include nearby villages of Stockbridge, King's Somborne and Braishfield.

Notable people with a connection to Michelmersh 
Mary Watson, one of the first two women to study chemistry at the University of Oxford

External links 

Details
Michelmersh and Timsbury parish

Gallery

References

Villages in Hampshire
Test Valley